Yueyang Museum is a historical museum in Yueyang, Hunan, China. The museum has a collection of more than 20,000 objects, including 6 national first level protected cultural relics.

History
Construction of Yueyang Museum, commenced in August 1996 and was completed the October 1999. Yueyang Museum was officially opened to the public on October 29 of that same year. The name was inscribed by Zhao Puchu, the former Venerable Master of the Buddhist Association of China.

Gallery

See also
 List of museums in China

References

Museums in Hunan
Museums established in 1999
1999 establishments in China
Buildings and structures in Yueyang
Tourist attractions in Yueyang
Hunan Museum